ING Bank Śląski SA (eng. ING Silesian Bank) (ING BSK) is a Polish bank based in Katowice. The majority owner is ING Group.

History
The bank was established as Bank Śląski in 1988 as a result of the separation from the National Bank of Poland. In 1991, it was transformed from a state bank into a limited company and in 1994 it debuted on the Warsaw Stock Exchange. Since 1996, the bank's majority shareholder is the Dutch ING Group. In 2001 Bank Śląski merged with ING Bank N.V. Branch in Warsaw. Since then, the bank is operating under the name of "ING Bank Śląski". On April 4, 2016 the Supervisory Board appointed Brunon Bartkiewicz as the President of the Management Board.

Name
The name 'Bank Śląski' is Polish for 'Silesian Bank'.

Shareholders 
 ING Bank N.V. – 75%
 Aviva Otwarty Fundusz Emerytalny Aviva BZ WBK – 6,05%
 Stock investors – 18,95%

Presidents
 1988–1994: Marian Rajczyk
 1995–2000: Brunon Bartkiewicz
 2000–2004: Marian Czakański
 2004–2009: Brunon Bartkiewicz
 2010–2016: Małgorzata Kołakowska
 Since 2016: Brunon Bartkiewicz

ING Group 
 ING ABL Polska SA
 ING Commercial Finance Polska SA 
 ING Lease (Polska) Sp. z o.o.
 ING Usługi dla Biznesu SA
 Nowe Usługi SA
 Solver Sp. z o.o.

References

External links

Banks of Poland
Companies based in Katowice
Companies listed on the Warsaw Stock Exchange
ING Group
1988 establishments in Poland